Kristin Malko (born November 15, 1982) is an American actress who appeared on Prison Break.

Early life
Malko grew up in Hillsborough Township, New Jersey and graduated from Hillsborough High School in New Jersey, and then Sarah Lawrence College in New York, where she began acting after her freshman year.

Career
She played Debra Jean Belle on the show Prison Break. Malko's character on the show falls in love with Lane Garrison's character, David "Tweener" Apolskis.

Filmography

References

External links

Living people
American television actresses
Actresses from New Jersey
People from Hillsborough Township, New Jersey
Hillsborough High School (New Jersey) alumni
Sarah Lawrence College alumni
1982 births
21st-century American women